Australochus is a genus of the parasitic wasp family Ichneumonidae. It currently consists of only one species, Australochus clypeator.

References

External links
Species List

Ichneumonidae genera